Veraphis is a genus of beetles belonging to the family Staphylinidae.

The species of this genus are found in Northern Europe.

Species:
 Veraphis assingi Jałoszyński, 2013 
 Veraphis calcarifer Jałoszyński, 2012

References

Staphylinidae
Staphylinidae genera